Jacob McQuaide (born December 7, 1987) is an American football long snapper for the Detroit Lions of the National Football League (NFL). He was signed by the St. Louis Rams as an undrafted free agent in 2011. McQuaide played college football at Ohio State.

Early years
McQuaide attended Elder High School. As a sophomore, he contributed to the football team winning an OHSAA State Championship. As a senior, he had 10 receptions for 125 yards at tight end. He also lettered in basketball.

He walked-on at Ohio State University. As a redshirt freshman, he was rotated in the first seven games at long snapper, along with seniors Dimitrios Makridis and Jackson Haas. He was removed from the rotation the rest of the season because of inconsistency issues and did not play in the last 6 contests.

As a sophomore, he was named the team's long snapper for punts and placement kicks, while earning a football scholarship. 

During his college career, he remained as team's long snapper, but was never able to take snaps or record any stats at the tight end position. He was a part of 3 Big Ten Conference championships (2007, 2008 and 2009).

Professional career

St. Louis / Los Angeles Rams
McQuaide was signed as an undrafted free agent by the St. Louis Rams after the 2011 NFL Draft on July 29. As a rookie, he beat Chris Massey for the long snapper job.

He served as the Rams' long snapper every game from 2011 to 2020. As a member of the Los Angeles Rams, McQuaide was selected to his first Pro Bowl as a "need" player on January 18, 2017. He was selected to his second consecutive Pro Bowl as a "need" player on January 17, 2018.

On March 9, 2018, McQuaide signed a three-year contract extension with the Rams through the 2020 season. During his time with the Rams, he appeared in all 160 regular season games through his first ten seasons and made 10 special teams tackles.

Dallas Cowboys
On March 22, 2021, McQuaide signed with the Dallas Cowboys to replace long snapper L. P. Ladouceur, reuniting with special teams coordinator John Fassel, who was his coach with the Rams, along with his former teammate placekicker Greg Zuerlein. 

On March 14, 2022, McQuaide re-signed with Dallas on a one-year contract. In the fourth game against the Washington Commanders, he suffered a torn left tricep on his final snap. On October 4, 2022, he was placed on the injured reserve list, forcing to miss the first games of his career.

References

External links
Dallas Cowboys bio

1987 births
Living people
Players of American football from Cincinnati
American football long snappers
Ohio State Buckeyes football players
St. Louis Rams players
Los Angeles Rams players
National Conference Pro Bowl players
Elder High School alumni
Dallas Cowboys players